Evil Friends is the seventh studio album by American rock band Portugal. The Man. It was released on June 4, 2013 through Atlantic Records. It is the band's first collaboration with producer Danger Mouse.

The album was promoted by the singles "Evil Friends", "Purple Yellow Red and Blue" and "Modern Jesus". It received favorable reviews from music critics, and charted in the US, Austria, Germany, France and Switzerland.

Promotion
Throughout early 2013, Portugal. The Man teased Evil Friends by leaking pictures on the official Bonnaroo Tumblr page, which showed that celebrated producer Danger Mouse (best known for his work with MF Doom, Gnarls Barkley, Jack White and Broken Bells, and for producing award-winning albums for artists like Gorillaz, The Black Keys and Norah Jones), was producing Portugal. The Man's new record.

On February 25, 2013, the band revealed the title of the album on Instagram. On March 6, the band revealed the album art for Evil Friends using a Tweet-To-Reveal Mosaic.

In the months leading up to the release of the album, John Gourley posted dozens of photos on the band's Instagram and Tumblr feeds featuring portraits of high-profile celebrities and musicians, including Thom Yorke and Kendrick Lamar, overlaid with his satanic illustrations. The band partnered with Aviary web application suite to release a sticker pack of the various elements in these drawings, allowing fans to create their own #EvilFriends portraits and upload them to Instagram.

On May 29, 2013 the band held a party in partnership with Tumblr at LAB ART Los Angeles that showcased the artwork of The Fantastic The (John Gourley and Austin Sellers) and the photography of Danger Mouse, and featured a GIF-ITI mural collaboration between John Gourley and street artist INSA. Evil Friends was simultaneously released as streaming online on the band's Tumblr page.

Singles and music videos
On March 7, 2013, the band released a music video for the album's lead single and title track "Evil Friends". The video was directed by Michael Ragen. The song was released to modern rock radio stations on April 1, 2013.

"Purple Yellow Red and Blue" was released as the second single to promote the album on April 23, 2013. A music video for the song, directed by That Go (Noel Paul and Stefan Moore), was released onto YouTube a day earlier. The song was released to radio on May 20, 2013, and was later featured in the soundtrack of EA Sports game, FIFA 14. The track features background vocals by Este and Danielle Haim of the American alternative rock band Haim.

On May 23, 2013, the band released a music video for "Atomic Man", directed by David Vincent Wolf.

The third and final single from the album, "Modern Jesus", was released digitally on August 30, 2013. On August 7, a music video directed by AG Rojas was released. The song impacted modern rock radio stations on October 28, 2013.

Critical reception

Evil Friends received generally favorable reviews from music critics. At Metacritic, which assigns a normalized rating out of 100 to reviews from mainstream critics, the album received an average score of 76, based on 17 reviews.

Track listing

Personnel 
Portugal. The Man
John Baldwin Gourley – vocals, guitar, organ, synthesizers
Zachary Scott Carothers – bass, percussion, backing vocals
Kyle O'Quin – piano, synthesizers, whistle
Noah Gersh – guitar, percussion, backing vocals
Kane Ritchotte – percussion, backing vocals

Technical personnel
Danger Mouse – production, synthesizer,
Phillip Peterson - Strings, Arranging
Patton Thomas - production, noise, soundscapes, spoken word

Charts

References 

2013 albums
Albums produced by Danger Mouse (musician)
Atlantic Records albums
Portugal. The Man albums
Albums recorded at Kingsize Soundlabs
Albums recorded at Electro-Vox Recording Studios